Jalan Tengku Muhamad, Federal Route 227, is a federal road in Kuantan, Pahang, Malaysia. The road connects Alor Akar in the north to Teluk Cempedak in the south. It was named after the former second and fourth Menteri Besar (Chief Minister) of Pahang, Tengku Muhammad ibni Almarhum Sultan Ahmad Al-Mu’adzam Shah. The Kilometre Zero of the Federal Route 227 starts at Alor Akar junctions.

At most sections, the Federal Route 227 was built under the JKR R5 road standard, with a speed limit of 90 km/h.

List of junctions

References

Malaysian Federal Roads